CAK is the IATA code for Akron-Canton Airport, in Green, Ohio, USA.

Cak or CAK may also refer to:

 Cák, a Hungarian village
 Cak!, a comedy album by Alexei Sayle
 Cak (instrument), used in Indonesian Keroncong music
 Controlled Atmosphere Killing, animal slaughter by asphyxiation
 CDK-activating kinases
 Christian Academy of Knoxville
 CAK, the ICAO airline designator for Congo Air, Bahamas
 Kaqchikel language, identified by the IS 639 3 code cak